Sanjin Pehlivanović (born 11 August 2001) is a Bosnian professional pool player. Pehlivanovic won the WPA World Nine-ball Championship, defeating Robbie Capito in the final 9–1. He is also an eight-time junior European Pool Championships champion, winning events 8-Ball, 9-Ball, and 10-Ball. In 2021, he also received a runners-up medal in the European championship 9-Ball event, losing in the final to Germany's Joshua Filler.

At the 2017 Klagenfurt Open, Pehlivanvic reached the quarter-finals, his best result on the Euro Tour to date. He would lose the match 9–8 to Mateusz Śniegocki.

Titles
 Euro Tour
 Salzberg Open (2015)
 European Pool Championship
 10-Ball (2022)
 WPA World Nine-ball Junior Championship (2017)

References

Bosnia and Herzegovina pool players
Living people
Bosnia and Herzegovina sportspeople
2001 births
Competitors at the 2022 World Games
World Games silver medalists